This is the overview of the qualification for the football tournament at the 1960 Summer Olympics.

Qualifications
The final tournament had 16 spots.

The others were allocated as follows:

 Europe: 7 places, contested by 22 teams (including Israel).
 Americas: 3 places, contested by 10 teams.
 Africa: 2 places, contested by 9 teams (including Malta).
 Asia: 2 places, contested by 8 teams.
 Middle East: 1 place, contested by 3 teams.

Europe

Preliminary round 

The IOC's rules allowed only one German team to enter. After talks for a Unified Team broke down, 
the football federations and NOCs of West and East Germany agreed to organise a play-off between their teams. Both matches were agreed to be played without spectators, and the sites of the games were announced at short notice.

West Germany win 4–1 on aggregate.

Group 1 

Denmark qualify.

Group 2 

Poland qualify.

Group 3 

Bulgaria qualify.

Group 4 

Yugoslavia qualify.

Group 5 

Great Britain qualify.

Group 6 

France qualify.

Group 7 

Hungary qualify.

Americas

Round 1

|}
|}
|}

Mexico win 3–1 on aggregate.

Suriname win 6–3 on aggregate.

Brazil win 7–3 on aggregate.

Argentina win 11–1 on aggregate.

Peru win 9–2 on aggregate.

Round 2 

Argentina, Peru and Brazil qualify.

Africa

Round 1

Group 1

Group 2

Group 3

Round 2 

United Arab Republic and Tunisia qualify.

Asia

Round 1 

|}
|}
|}
|}

1Australia withdrew.
2Afghanistan withdrew before the second leg.
3Both matches were played in Tokyo due to the lack of a suitable stadium in South Korea.

India advance.

Republic of China win 6–2 on aggregate.

South Korea win 2–1 on aggregate.

Round 2 

|}

1 Both matches played in Taipei. 
2 The match was abandoned in the 23rd minute with the Republic of China leading 1–0 after Korean players and officials attacked the referee in response to a penalty being given against them; the match was awarded to the Republic of China 2–0.

Republic of China qualified.

India won 6–2 on aggregate and qualified.

Middle East

Lebanon withdrew after two matches: the remaining two matches were awarded to their opponent Turkey 2–0.

Turkey qualify.

References

External links
 RSSSF